Hyundai Motor Company maintains 12 manufacturing facilities in 10 countries, along with assembling vehicles in assembly plants owned by local companies in several countries.

Domestic plants

Ulsan Plant 

The Ulsan Plant is Hyundai Motor’s main production plant. The Ulsan complex sits on 1,200 acres and is the world’s largest single automobile plant. The complex comprises five independent plants which employs over 34,000 workers capable of producing 5,600 vehicles daily, producing 38.2 percent of the nation’s vehicles. The plant also has its own port where up to three 42,000 ton ships can anchor at the same time. The plant is the birthplace of the South Korean automobile industry and is a self-contained facility that operates its own fire station, hospital and security vehicles. The production of the Pony, South Korea’s first mass-produced car, began in the plant.

Current models

Plant 1 
Completed in 1968, the Plant 1 produces 311,000 vehicles per year.
 Hyundai Veloster (2011-2022)
 Hyundai Kona (2017–present)
Hyundai Ioniq 5 (2021–present)

Plant 2 
Completed in 1986, the Plant 2 produces 257,000 vehicles per year.
 Hyundai Santa Fe
 Hyundai Tucson
 Hyundai Palisade (2019–present)
 Genesis GV80 (2020–present)

Plant 3 
Completed in 1990, the Plant 3 produces 333,000 vehicles per year.
 Hyundai Elantra/Avante
 Hyundai i30
 Hyundai Ioniq (2016-2022)
 Hyundai Venue (2019–present)

Plant 4 
Completed in 1991, the Plant 4 produces 235,000 vehicles per year.
 Hyundai Starex
Hyundai Porter
Hyundai Palisade
Hyundai Staria (2021–present)

Plant 5 
Completed in 1991, the Plant 5 produces 264,000 vehicles per year.
 Hyundai Tucson
Hyundai Nexo
Genesis G70 (2017–present)
Genesis G80
 Genesis G90

Asan Plant 
The Asan Plant, consisting of one plant, mainly produces the Sonata and Grandeur sedans. It also produces the Nu, Theta, and Lambda engines.

Current models 
 Hyundai Sonata
 Hyundai Grandeur
 Hyundai Ioniq 6

Gwangju Global Motors (GGM) 

Gwangju Global Motors (GGM) is a joint venture manufacturing plant between Hyundai Motor Company and the Gwangju city government. It is opened in 2021 as the first newly-built automobile manufacturing plant in South Korea since 1998. It is the only Hyundai-operated manufacturing plant in South Korea without the presence of workers unions, which enables average annual pay to be less than half than other Hyundai plants.

Current models 

 Hyundai Casper (2021–present)

Overseas plants

Hyundai Motor Manufacturing Alabama (HMMA) 

Opened in 2005, Hyundai Motor Manufacturing Alabama (HMMA) is a manufacturing facility owned by Hyundai Motor Company employing approximately 3,000 people. Located in Montgomery, Alabama, the facility marked the official start of production with the 2006 Sonata in May 2005. HMMA is capable of producing up to 399,500 vehicles per year at full capacity. Apart from vehicle assembly, HMMA also produces Smartstream G2.5 GDI, G1.6 T-GDI, G2.0 Atkinson, G2.5 GDI, and G2.5 T-GDI engines.

Current models 

 Hyundai Sonata (May 2005 – December 2022)
Hyundai Santa Fe (April 2006 – present)
 Hyundai Elantra (November 2010 – present)
Hyundai Tucson (February 2021 – present)
Hyundai Santa Cruz (June 2021 – present)

Hyundai Motor Brasil (HMB) 

Located in Piracicaba, São Paulo, Hyundai Motor Brasil (HMB) is the first Hyundai Motor plant in Latin America. With an investment of around R$1.2 billion, the plant has the capacity to produce 180,000 cars per year under three shifts. The plant produced the HB20 subcompact line-up, which stands for 'Hyundai Brasil'.

Current models 

 Hyundai HB20 (2012–present)
 Hyundai Creta (2017–present)

Hyundai Motor Manufacturing Czech (HMMC) 

In November 2008, Hyundai opened the European plant in Nošovice, Czech Republic, following an investment of over 1 billion euros and over two years of construction. The plant, which mainly manufactures the i30 and Tucson for the European market, has an annual capacity of 300,000 cars. It previously also built the ix20 mini MPV. The new Hyundai plant is 90 kilometres north of Kia Žilina Plant in Slovakia. It began manufacturing Kona Electric since March 2020 at the same production line with i30 and Tucson. In 2022, HMMC made transition into eco-friendly factory according to the carbon-neutral plan and is being operated by electric power generated from renewable energy.

Current models 

 Hyundai i30 (2008–present)
 Hyundai Tucson/ix35 (2011–present)
Hyundai Kona Electric (2020–present)

Hyundai Assan Otomotiv (HAOS) 

Opened in September 1997, Hyundai Assan Otomotiv (HAOS) is a joint venture between the Hyundai Motor Company of South Korea and the Kibar Holding of Turkey. It is located in Kozyatagi, Istanbul, Turkey. It serves as the production base of small Hyundai models for the European market. Throughout its operations, the plant has also produced the Accent, Matrix, Grace and Starex. It is the first overseas plant owned by Hyundai Motor Company.

Current models 

 Hyundai i20 (2010–present)
 Hyundai i10 (2013–present)
 Hyundai Bayon (2021–present)

Hyundai Motor Manufacturing Rus (HMMR) 

Located in Saint Petersburg, Hyundai started the construction of the Hyundai Motor Manufacturing Rus (HMMR) plant with a planned yearly capacity of 100,000 cars in June 2008, that will eventually be increased to 200,000 units. It started mass production in January 2011.

In December 2020, Hyundai has completed the acquisition of a decommissioned General Motors manufacturing plant in Shushary, Saint Petersburg, making it the second plant for HMMR.

Current models 
 Hyundai Solaris (2011–present)
Kia Rio (2011–present)
Hyundai Creta (2016–present)

Hyundai Motor India (HMIL) 

Formed in May 1996, Hyundai Motor India (HMIL) started its operations producing its first model in September 1998, the Santro. HMIL is the global export hub for compact cars for emerging markets. HMIL has two manufacturing plants in Irungattukottai and Sriperumbudur in Tamil Nadu, both near the city of Chennai. In 2021, the cumulative production exceeded 10 million units. In 2019, additional electric vehicle production lines were established to start assembly production (CKD) of Kona Electric, and partial assembly production (SKD) of Ioniq 5 was decided in August 2022.

Current models 
Hyundai Verna (2006–present)
Hyundai i10 (2007–present)
Hyundai i20 (2008–present)
Hyundai Creta (2015–present)
Hyundai Venue (2019–present)
Hyundai Aura (2020–present)
Hyundai Alcazar (2021–present)
Hyundai Tucson (2017–present, CKD)
Hyundai Kona Electric (2019–present, CKD)
Hyundai Ioniq 5 (2023–present, CKD)

Hyundai Motor Manufacturing Indonesia (HMMI) 

Hyundai Motor Manufacturing Indonesia (HMMI) is built in Cikarang, Bekasi, West Java in 2019 and fully operated in January 2022 with the annual capacity of 150,000 vehicles, upgradable to 250,000. Half of the output is exported to the neighbouring countries in Southeast Asia. A total of US$1.55 billion (Rp 21.7 trillion) would be invested to the plant along with the future product developments until 2030. HMMI produces the Stargazer compact MPV in this plant among other models.

Current models 

 Hyundai Creta (2022–present)
 Hyundai Ioniq 5 (2022–present, CKD)
 Hyundai Santa Fe (2022–present, CKD)
 Hyundai Stargazer (2022–present)

Hyundai Motor Group Innovation Center in Singapore (HMGCS) 
The Hyundai Motor Group Innovation Center in Singapore is built in Jurong and produces the Hyundai Ioniq 5 since 2023, and will produce the Hyundai Ioniq 3 later. Hyundai plans to produce 30,000 battery electric models a year at the plant, of which about 6,000 will be sold in Singapore.

Current models 
 Hyundai Ioniq 5 (2023–present, CKD)

Joint venture overseas plants

Beijing Hyundai Motor Company (BHMC) 

Beijing Hyundai Motor Company (BHMC) is a 50-50 joint venture between Hyundai Motor and Beijing Automotive Holdings, which was established in 2002. It began operations in China by producing Sonata in December 2002. It operates in Shunyi District, a satellite city of Beijing, producing Hyundai-branded automobiles for the Chinese market.

Hyundai is transforming its Chongqing Plant 5 in China into an electric vehicle plant in a bid to reinvigorate its slumping Chinese business, as the plant suffered a low operation rate as it was completed when China’s retaliation against South Korea peaked in 2017.

Current models 
 Hyundai Sonata (2002–present)
 Hyundai Elantra (2003–present)
 Hyundai Tucson (2005–present)
 Hyundai ix35 (2010–present)
 Hyundai Verna (2011–present)
 Hyundai Santa Fe (2012–present)
 Hyundai Mistra (2013–present)
 Hyundai ix25 (2014–present)
 Hyundai Celesta (2017–present)
 Hyundai Lafesta (2018–present)
Hyundai Custo (2021–present)

Hyundai Thanh Cong Manufacturing Vietnam (HTMV) 
Located in Gian Khau Industrial Park, Ninh Binh province, the factory is a joint venture between Hyundai Motor Company and Thanh Cong Manufacturing. Hyundai began exporting its cars in complete knock down (CKD) format to Vietnam in 2011. In 2017, these two companies established Hyundai Thanh Cong Manufacturing Vietnam (HTMV) to produce complete cars with a minimum localization rate of 40 percent.

Current models 
 Hyundai i10
 Hyundai Tucson
 Hyundai Porter
Hyundai Accent (2018–present)
 Hyundai Santa Fe (2018–present)

Partner assembly plants

Hyundai CAOA 
Hyundai vehicles have also been produced in Brazil at a plant located in Anápolis, Goiás. Production here started with the HR model in 2007, and continued with the Tucson in 2010, the HD78 truck in 2011, and the ix35 in 2013.

Hyundai Asia Resources (HARI) 
Hyundai Asia Resources, Inc. (HARI) is the assembler and distributor of Hyundai passenger cars and commercial vehicles in the Philippines. The company were appointed in August 2001 as the official distributor of Hyundai vehicles in the Philippines. Locally assembled Hyundai models consist of the Hyundai Accent Sedan, Hyundai H350 and the Hyundai H100 vans, all undergo final assembly at Hyundai's Assembly Center (HAC), located at Santa Rosa, Laguna.

Handal Indonesia Motor (HIM) 
PT Hyundai Indonesia Motor (HIM) was established in 1996 as PT Citra Mobil Nasional, assembling Bimantara-badged vehicles based on the Hyundai Accent and Hyundai Elantra. It assembles the Hyundai H-1/Starex since 2010 for domestic market and exports to Thailand, Bhutan, and Brunei. It is renamed to PT Handal Indonesia Motor since November 2020, offering vehicle assembly services to other brands as well.

Ghabbour Group 

Hyundai cars are also manufactured in Egypt, the local manufacturer is the Ghabbour Group, which is located in Cairo. They have a big model range and offers sports models of some car models which are only offered on the Egypt market. Formerly, the company had assembled vehicles such as the Verna.

References

External links 

 Official website

 
Manufacturing in South Korea
Lists of motor vehicle assembly plants